Institute "Latgyprogorstoy" - was a main institute of designing apartment houses in Latvian SSR.

Full name of the institute was Latvian state institute of designing state construction. Founded in 1951, the institute took part in construction of the most modern Riga, Liepāja and Daugavpils neighbourhoods. Not artistic, with a big number of defects, these houses served the main purpose - to give Latvia a big number of cheap living space. Most of the Latgyprogorstroy's projects were standard and had a number consisting of three figures.

Houses built under the projects of the institute has a big safety factor and still are the main living fund of Latvian cities. Beside the projects of apartment houses the institute designed the projects of schools, kindergartens, water pipe and sewerage networks. 
Latgyprogorstroy also took part in the construction of the city Slavutych - the new living place for the victims of Chernobyl Nuclear Power Plant accident.

The main office building of the Latgyprogorstoy was located in Riga at Gorky St. 38 (now Kr. Valdemara St.). The institute also had the branches in Liepāja and Daugavpils. The institute ceased its existence in 1990. On the base of the institute was founded public limited company Pilsētprojekts.

Staff 
 Viktors Valgums
 Modris Ģelzis
 Normunds Pavārs
 Zane Kalinka
 Andris Kokins

References 

Latvian Socialist Soviet Republic
Architecture in Latvia